The cuneiform sign id, also it, and with other sub-uses, including a sumerogram, Á, for Akkadian language idû, (English: to know, to make known, recognize, to inform, proclaim), is a common-use sign in the Epic of Gilgamesh, the Amarna letters, and other cuneiform texts. Letters ("d/t") are paired consonants in the Akkadian language ('voiced'/'unvoiced'), thus the other sub-uses of the sign are for ed, et, eṭ, and iṭ. Cuneiform id/it can be a syllabic for ed, et, eṭ, id, it, and iṭ, or an alphabetic for any of the constructs thereof. It is also has a sub-use for á, as well as the sumerogram for Á.

Epic of Gilgamesh usage
Cuneiform id/it has other sub-uses in the Epic of Gilgamesh. The following can be found: á--(5) times, ed--(4), et--(11), eṭ--(13), id--(27), it--(121), iṭ--(21), and Á--(3) times.

References

Moran, William L. 1987, 1992. The Amarna Letters. Johns Hopkins University Press, 1987, 1992. 393 pages.(softcover)
 Parpola, 1971. The Standard Babylonian Epic of Gilgamesh, Parpola, Simo, Neo-Assyrian Text Corpus Project, c 1997, Tablet I thru Tablet XII, Index of Names, Sign List, and Glossary-(pp. 119–145), 165 pages.

Cuneiform signs